"The Sky Above the Liberated Zone" ( "sky of liberated area") is a famous Chinese revolutionary song. It was composed by Liu Xilin in 1943 to words by Ji Lumin after a folk song. It is one of the songs featured in the 1964 musical The East is Red. An edition of the song is included in the East is Red songbook.

The tune has also frequently been recorded in instrumental versions, such as Le Ciel Au-Dessus De La Zone Libérée arranged for piano by Chu Wang Hua, and played by pianist Jia Zhong.

Classic recordings of the number include the version by Bao Hui Qiao, and those by the China Broadcast Choir.

Lyrics

External links

References

Songs about revolutions
Chinese songs
Chinese patriotic songs
1943 songs